Llansoy is a small village in Monmouthshire, south east Wales, United Kingdom, located about 3 miles (4.2 km) south east of Raglan.

History 
There is an Iron Age hillfort 1 mile (1.6 km) northwest of the village, at Great House, covering an area of about 5 acres (2 hectares) and overlooking the Olway Brook. Later, the area was reputedly settled by descendants of the Welsh king St. Brychan Brycheiniog.

Church of St. Tysoi
The parish church is believed to have been founded around the 6th century.  The dedication is to Tysoi of whom nothing is known, although he is thought to have been a pupil of St. Dyfrig.  The church is largely built in the Perpendicular style of the 14th or 15th century, although the whole church was restored in 1858. The tower probably dates from the late 17th century.

Amenities

The nearest pub, the Star Inn, is located about 1 mile (1.6 km) east of the village in the neighbouring parish of Llanfihangel Tor-y-Mynydd although its location is often given as Llansoy.

References

External links
  Llansoy and Llangwm community website
 Kelly's Directory 1901
  Geograph photos of Llansoy

Villages in Monmouthshire